Division by zero is a term used in mathematics if the divisor (denominator) is zero.

Division by Zero or Dividing by Zero or Divide by Zero may also refer to:

 Division by Zero (album), by Hux Flux, 2003
 Dividing by Zero, a 2002 album by Seven Storey Mountain
 "Dividing by Zero", a song by the Offspring from the 2012 album Days Go By
 Divide by Zero (album), by Killing Floor, 1997
 Division by Zero (story), by Ted Chiang, 1991

See also
 Zero Divide, video game
 American wire gauge, including 1/0, 2/0 etc
 "Two Divided by Zero", a song on the 1986 Pet Shop Boys album Please